A kopitiam or kopi tiam is a type of coffee shop mostly found in parts of Indonesia, Malaysia, Singapore, Brunei and Southern Thailand patronised for meals and beverages, and traditionally operated by the Chinese community of these countries. The word kopi is an Indonesian and Malay term for coffee and tiam is the Hokkien/Hakka term for shop. Menus typically feature simple offerings: a variety of foods based on egg, toast, kaya, plus coffee, tea, Horlicks and Milo.

Malaysia

In Malaysia, as in Singapore, kopitiams are found almost everywhere. However, there are a few differences. In Malaysia:
 the term kopitiam in Malaysia is usually referred specifically to Malaysian Chinese coffee shops;
 food in a kopitiam is usually exclusively Malaysian Chinese cuisine;
 food courts and hawker centres are usually not referred to as kopitiams.

Recently a new breed of "modern" kopitiams have sprung up. The popularity of the old-fashioned outlets along with society's obsession with nostalgia and increasing affluence has led to the revival of these pseudo-kopitiams. The new kopitiams are fast-food outlets which are reminiscent of the old kopitiams in terms of decor, but are usually built in a more modern, hygienic setting such as a shopping mall rather than in the traditional shophouse, catering mainly for young adults.

To offer the true kopitiam experience, modern kopitiams mostly offer authentic local coffee brews, charcoal grilled toast served with butter and kaya (a local version of jam made from coconut milk and eggs) and soft-boiled eggs. Some have extended menus where local breakfast, lunch and dinner meals are served. To tap into the sizeable Muslim market, these kopitiams usually serve food that is prepared to conform to Islamic dietary laws, unlike the traditional shophouse kopitiams.

Today there are no less than 100 brand names of modern kopitiams operating in various parts of Malaysia.

Kopitiams in Ipoh oldtown district serve Ipoh white coffee.  The coffee beans are roasted with palm-oil margarine and with less sugar, resulting in a brew that is lighter in colour than normal coffee beans that uses sugar – hence the name 'white coffee'.

Singapore
Kopi tiams (coffee shops) in Singapore are commonly found in almost all residential areas as well as some industrial and business districts in the country, numbering about 2,000 in total. Although most are an aggregate of small stalls or shops, some may be more reminiscent of food courts, although each stall has similar appearance and the same style of signage.
In a typical kopi tiam, the drinks stall is usually run by the owner who sells coffee, tea, soft drinks, and other beverages as well as breakfast items like kaya toast, soft-boiled eggs and snacks. The other stalls are leased by the owner to independent stallholders who prepare a variety of food dishes, often featuring the cuisine of Singapore. Traditional dishes from different ethnicities are usually available at kopitiams to encourage people from different ethnic backgrounds with different dietary habits to dine in a common place or even at a common table.

Kopi (coffee) was created when Singapore started its development and had to cater to the needs of the European population – specifically their love for coffee. 

Kopitiam is also the name of a food court chain in Singapore.

Some of the popular kopi tiams in Singapore include Kim San Leng, Killiney & Tong Ah Eating House or Ya Kun Kaya Toast.

Some of the more common foods that can be seen in kopi tiams, besides the ever-popular eggs and toast, consist of char kway tiao (fried flat rice noodles (hor fun), sometimes cooked with eggs and cockles), Hokkien mee (yellow wheat noodles served with various seafood as well as egg) and, possibly the most common, nasi lemak, or coconut rice (a Malay dish of coconut-flavoured rice, served with sambal chilli paste, egg, and fried anchovies).

"Coffee shop talk"
"Coffee shop talk" is a phrase used to describe gossip because it is often a familiar sight at kopi tiams where a group of workers or senior citizens would linger over cups of coffee and exchange news and comments on various topics including national politics, office politics, TV dramas, sports and food. Former Too Phat member Malique has a song called "Cerita Kedai Kopi", satirizing the stereotype.

Kopitiam beverage terms
At kopi tiams, coffee and tea are usually ordered using a specific vernacular featuring terms from different languages. Coffee and tea can be tailored to suit the drinker's taste by using the following suffixes when ordering:

 Kopi: Malay/Indonesian for coffee
 Teh: Malay/Indonesian/Hokkien for tea
 O: no milk, from Hokkien
 Si or C: with evaporated milk (Hainanese dialect)
 Siew dai: less sugar/milk (Hockchew/Fuzhou dialect)
 Ga dai: more sugar/milk
 Kosong: no sugar, Malay for "zero"
 Kao: extra thick (Hokkien)
 Poh: extra thin (Hokkien)
 Di loh: straight no water added
 Peng: with ice (Hokkien)
 Pua sio: Hokkien - Means half hot - which gives you a drinkable, still warm Kopi/Tea.
 Tarik: Malay for pulled. 

These are typically chained together to customize a drink order: a "kopi si kosong" will result in a coffee with evaporated milk and no sugar. The syntax is “drink – milk – sugar – concentration – temperature”.

Examples
 Kopi o = hot black coffee (with sugar)
 Kopi o peng = iced black coffee (with sugar)
 Kopi o kosong = hot black coffee (unsweetened)
 Kopi o kosong peng = iced black coffee (unsweetened)
 Kopi = Coffee with condensed milk
 Kopi peng = iced coffee with condensed milk
 Kopi si = hot coffee with evaporated milk and with sugar
 Kopi si kosong = hot coffee with evaporated milk
 Kopi si peng = iced coffee with evaporated milk, with sugar
 Kopi sterng = iced coffee extra smooth
 Teh o = hot tea (without milk, sweetened)
 Teh o peng = iced tea (without milk, sweetened)
 Teh o kosong = hot tea (without milk, unsweetened)
 Teh o kosong peng = iced tea (without milk, unsweetened)
 Teh = Tea with condensed milk
 Teh tarik = Tea with condensed milk that is pulled (poured from a height) multiple times
 Teh peng = iced milk tea (sweetened)
 Teh si = hot tea with evaporated milk (sweetened)
 Teh si kosong = hot tea with evaporated milk (unsweetened)
 Teh si peng = iced tea with evaporated milk (sweetened)
 Tiao hee or tiao her = Chinese tea
 Tat kiu = Milo
 Cham = mixed of coffee and tea (sweetened)
 Cham peng = iced version of Cham (sweetened)
 Yin yang/Yuan yang = same as Cham
 Michael Jackson = mixture of soy milk and grass jelly (black and white)
 Tai Ka Ho = Horlicks (means 'Hello everyone')

See also

 Punjabi dhaba
 Indonesian cuisine
 Malaysian cuisine
 Singaporean cuisine
 Hawker centre
 Pasar malam (night market)
 Mamak stall
 Coffeeshop
 Cha chaan teng

References

Further reading

 

Indonesian cuisine
Malaysian cuisine
Singaporean cuisine
Restaurants in Malaysia
Fast-food chains of Singapore
Food court in Singapore
Coffeehouses and cafés in Singapore
Types of coffeehouses and cafés
Restaurants by type
Hokkien-language phrases
Coffee in Indonesia